The 1894–95 season was the third season in Liverpool F.C.'s existence, and was their second year in The Football League, in which they competed in the First Division for the first time. The season covers the period from 1 July 1894 to 30 June 1895.

Test Match 1895
Liverpool lost 1-0 to Bury on 27 April and were relegated back to the second division.

References

External links
LFC History Season 1894-95
1893–94 Liverpool F.C.Results
LFC Kit 1893-94

1894-1895
English football clubs 1894–95 season